Sibusiso Gideon Mabiliso (born 14 April 1999) is a South African soccer player who currently plays as a defender for AmaZulu.

Club career
Mabiliso was born in Rustenburg.

Mabiliso signed for Kaizer Chiefs in summer 2021. In August 2022, his contract with Chiefs was terminated by mutual consent, having made 6 appearances during the 2021–22 season. He resigned for AmaZulu two weeks later.

International career
He made his debut for South Africa national soccer team on 10 June 2021 in a friendly against Uganda. He was later selected for the South Africa Olympic team and appeared in their opening game at the Tokyo Olympics.

Career statistics

Club

References

1999 births
Living people
South African soccer players
South Africa under-20 international soccer players
South Africa international soccer players
People from Rustenburg
Sportspeople from North West (South African province)
Association football defenders
South African Premier Division players
Platinum Stars F.C. players
AmaZulu F.C. players
Kaizer Chiefs F.C. players
Footballers at the 2020 Summer Olympics
Olympic soccer players of South Africa